Maja Siegenthaler (born 11 November 1992) is a Swiss competitive sailor. She and Linda Fahrni competed for Switzerland at the 2016 Summer Olympics in the women's 470 class, and at the 2020 Summer Olympics in the women's 470 class.

References

External links
 
 
 

1992 births
Living people
Swiss female sailors (sport)
Olympic sailors of Switzerland
Sailors at the 2016 Summer Olympics – 470
Sailors at the 2020 Summer Olympics – 470